Juchitán District is located in the east of the Istmo de Tehuantepec region of the State of Oaxaca, Mexico, covering the southern part of a low-lying corridor through the mountains that separates the Gulf of Mexico from the Pacific ocean.
The district has an area of 13,300 km2 and a population as of 2005 of 339,445.

Environment

The climate is warm. 
The district is relatively flat in the southern coastal plain, bounded by lagoons and then the ocean. 
Inland to the north it is hillier, rising to the crest of the isthmus and then descending towards the Veracruz coastal plain of the Gulf of Mexico. The land rises to mountains to the West (Sierra Madre de Oaxaca) and the East (Sierra Madre de Chiapas).
The municipalities of Santa María Chimalapa and San Miguel Chimalapa contain a large part of the Selva Zoque, the largest tract of tropical rainforest in Mexico, which contains the majority of terrestrial biodiversity in the country.

Economy

Other than in the towns of the trans-isthmus corridor in the west of the district, most people are engaged in agriculture. Near the coast, there is fishing activity, and in some inland areas fine lumber is extracted for use in furniture making.
The government has plans to develop the trans-isthmus corridor. This includes improving transportation routes across the isthmus between the Caribbean and the Pacific, and developing an industrial zone along the highway. Other plans include creating coffee plantations and cattle corridors, expanding production of beans, maize and chili and exploiting the bio-genetic resources of native medicinal plants.

The isthmus has reliable, dominant north-south winds.
Some pilot wind farms have been built, notably at La Venta. 
There are plans to build more, although there has been local resistance due to the communal ownership of land and concerns that the annual rental prices offered are too low 
A plan first proposed in 1977 for a dam in Los Chimalapas has been stalled due to environmental concerns.
In June 2008 the State of Oaxaca was again proposing construction of a storage dam in the El Corte River basin in the Chimalapa sub-region, with the potential to irrigate 100,000 hectares of the Isthmus of Tehuantepec and to supply water to the Salina Cruz Refinery.

Municipalities

The district includes the following municipalities:

Gallery

References

Districts of Oaxaca
Istmo de Tehuantepec